Peter Jackson Hammond (born 9 May 1945), is a Professor of Economics and a Research Associate for CAGE (Centre for Competitive Advantage in the Global Economy) at the University of Warwick. In the past he has also worked as the Marie Curie Professor of Economic Theory at the University of Warwick and an Emeritus Professor of Economics at Stanford University. He has made numerous significant contributions to the advancement of Economic Theory.

Education 
His undergraduate study was in Mathematics at the University of Cambridge (Trinity Hall) from 1964–1967. He continued at Cambridge as a Research Student in Economics at the Faculty of Economics and Politics (1967–1969) and went on to earn a PhD in Economics there in 1974.

Career 
During his career, he has held numerous positions, he was a professor of economics at Stanford University from 1979–2007 (Emeritus from April 2007). He has held positions at the London School of Economics, Nuffield College, Oxford, Princeton University, the University of Essex, Australian National University, University of Bonn, University of Bristol, University of Kiel, the National University of Singapore and the Hebrew University of Jerusalem to name some.

Honours and awards 
He has been the recipient of various honours and awards. He was elected to a fellowship of the Econometric Society in 1977 and held a Guggenheim Fellowship from 1987–88. He is also a Fellow of the British Academy.

He was awarded Honorary Doctorates in Economics and Social Sciences from the University of Kiel and in Philosophy from the University of Oslo.

Selected bibliography

Books

Chapters in books

References

1945 births
Living people
British economists
Alumni of Trinity Hall, Cambridge
Academics of the University of Warwick
Fellows of the Econometric Society
Stanford University Department of Economics faculty
21st-century American economists